
Zamość County is a unit of territorial administration and local government (powiat) in Lublin Voivodeship, eastern Poland. It was established on January 1, 1999, as a result of the Polish local government reforms passed in 1998. Its administrative seat is the city of Zamość, although the city is not part of the county (it constitutes a separate city county).

As of 2019, its total population is 107,441, including a population of 4,991 in Szczebrzeszyn, 3,175 in Zwierzyniec, 3,091 in Krasnobród, and a rural population of 96,184.

Neighbouring counties
Apart from the city of Zamość, Zamość County is also bordered by Krasnystaw County and Chełm County to the north, Hrubieszów County to the east, Tomaszów Lubelski County to the south, and Biłgoraj County to the west.

Administrative division
The county is subdivided into 15 gminas (three urban-rural and 12 rural). These are listed in the following table, in descending order of population.

References

 
Land counties of Lublin Voivodeship